These are the results of the cadet female saber competition at the 2010 Summer Youth Olympics. The competition was held on August 16.

Results

Pool Round

Pool 1

Pool 2

Bracket

Final standings

References

Fencing at the 2010 Summer Youth Olympics
Youth